"How Do I Say Goodbye" is a song by Australian singer and songwriter Dean Lewis. The song was released on 2 September 2022 as the third single from Lewis' second studio album, The Hardest Love.

Background
Lewis wrote the song for his father, who was diagnosed with cancer in 2019. He has since gone into remission.

Music video
The official video was directed by Sean Loaney and premiered on 6 September 2022. The music video features footage taken by Lewis's father during the singer's childhood.

Track listings

Charts

Weekly charts

Year-end charts

Certifications

References

 
2022 singles
2022 songs
Dean Lewis songs
Songs written by Dean Lewis
Songs written by Jon Hume